Tell Arbid is an ancient Near East archaeological site in the Khabur River Basin region of Al-Hasakah Governorate, Syria. It is located 45 km south of Tell Mozan, the site of ancient Urkesh.

History 
The history and identity of Tell Arbid have been emerging as the result of recent excavations. It is now clear that the most prosperous period for the ancient Arbid was the 3rd millennium BC.

The site was heavily occupied during the Early Dynastic period that started c. 2900 BC, primarily during Ninevite 5 (2900-2600 BC). In northern Mesopotamia this is equivalent to the Early Jezirah I–II period. The ruins of an extensive city dated to the Ninevite 5 period cover almost the entire site.

Other contemporary sites in this area of Khabur River basin are Hamoukar and Chagar Bazar.

Later, the occupation continued during the Early Dynastic III period (Early Jezirah III, 2600-2350 BC).

The site was occupied only sporadically in the Akkadian, Mitanni, Neo-Babylonian and the Hellenistic period.

Archaeology

History of research 
The initial excavation of Tell Arbid was performed by a British Museum team led by M.E.L. Mallowan. The operation ran from 1934 to 1936. Items collected during the excavations ended up in the British Museum, the Institute of Archaeology Collections at University College London, the Ashmolean Museum in Oxford, and in Syria. A survey was done at the site in the 1990s by Bertille Lyonnet of the Centre National de Recherches Scientifiques in Paris. Since 1996, the site has been excavated by a Polish-Syrian team led by Piotr Bieliński from the Polish Centre of Mediterranean Archaeology University of Warsaw and Dr. Ahmad Serriyeh from Damascus University. This work has continued through the 2010 season.
During 2000 they were assisted by a joint American/Austrian team from the University of Vienna and Archeos Inc.

Archaeological discoveries 
Tell Arbid is a multicultural site. It comprises a large main tell and 4 smaller mounds, together covering about 38 hectares with a height of around 30 meters. The main tell consists primarily of Mittanni, Akkadian, Early Dynastic, and Ninevite 5 layers with the latter two including monumental buildings.

In the Bronze Age, it was a medium-sized city located between the largest centers of the region in the 3rd millennium BC: Tell Brak (ancient Nagar) and Tell Mozan (ancient Urkish). It was inhabited from the Ninevite 5 period through the Hellenistic period, i.e., from about 2750 BC to the 2nd century BC. The main period of occupation occurred in the Bronze Age; the youngest remains – from the Neo-Babylonian and Hellenistic periods – are scarce.

The most important features include a Ninevite 5 temple (the so-called Southern Temple) with a ramp leading to it, uncovered in 2008. Another sacral building, the so-called Southwestern Temple, was found on the western side of the tell. The excavators also identified graves from different periods – Ninevite 5 culture, Khabur culture (1950–1500 BC), and two richly-furnished women's graves from the Mitanni period (1500–1300 BC).

The city was in its heyday in the first half of the 3rd millennium BC. Residential and economic quarters, as well as official and sacral buildings, date to this period. The finds from the Akkadian period are fewer and include whole vessels and architectural remains. Traces of settlement dating to the beginning of the 2nd millennium BC were found only in some parts of the site. The Mitanni-period layers yielded residential houses and graves. After a settlement hiatus, which lasted until the Neo-Babylonian period, domestic structures reappeared; finds from this period include cylinder seals. The excavators also discovered the remains of a caravanserai from the 3rd millennium BC.

The excavations at Tell Arbid yielded a rich assemblage of 577 zoomorphic and 67 anthropomorphic clay figurines, dated to the 3rd and 2nd millennium BC. Stone beads (made of carnelian and lapis lazuli, among others), cylinder seals, and stone tools were also found. An interesting group of objects consists of 40 terracotta chariot models, preserved whole or in fragments, dating from the Ninevite 5 culture to the Khabur culture.

Notes

See also 

 Cities of the ancient Near East

References
Come, Tell Me How You Live, Agatha Christie, Akadine Press, 2002, 
Piotr Bielinski, Tell Arbid: Preliminary report 1998, Polish archaeology in the Mediterranean, vol. 10, pp. 205–216, 1998
 Piotr Bielinski, Tell Arbid: The 2003 campaign of Polish-Syrian excavations preliminary report, Polish archaeology in the Mediterranean, vol. 15, pp. 335–353, 2003
 Piotr Bielinski, Tell Arbid: Interim report of the fifth season, Polish archaeology in the Mediterranean, vol. 12, pp. 315–326, 2000
 Piotr Bielinski, Tell Arbid: The sixth campaign of excavations preliminary report, Polish archaeology in the Mediterranean, vol. 13, pp. 279–294, 2001
 Piotr Bielinski, Tell Arbid: The seventh season of excavations: Preliminary report, Polish archaeology in the Mediterranean, vol. 14, pp. 301–314, 2002
 Tell Arbid. Preliminary Report on the Results of the Twelfth Season of Syrian-Polish Excavations, Polish Archaeology in the Mediterranean, vol. 19, pp. 537–554, 2010
 Tell Arbid 2008–2009. Preliminary Report on the Results of the Thirteenth and Fourteenth Seasons of Polish-Syrian Excavations, Polish Archaeology in the Mediterranean, vol. 21, pp. 511–536, 2012
 Preliminary Results of the Fifteenth Field Season of Joint Polish–Syrian Explorations on Tell Arbid, Polish Archaeology in the Mediterranean, vol. 22, pp. 351–370, 2013
 A. Soltysiak, Short Fieldwork Report. Tell Arbid (Syria), Seasons 1996–2002, Studies in Historical Anthropology, vol. 3, pp. 135–136, 2006

External links
Polish-Syrian Archaeological Expedition to Tell Arbid
Polish Centre of Mediterranean Archaeology
Austrian-American Expetition to Tell Arbid in 1999

Bronze Age sites in Syria
Former populated places in Syria
Archaeological sites in al-Hasakah Governorate
Tells (archaeology)